Aili Venonya (1963–2022) was a Namibian politician who served as a regional authority councillor for Moses Garoëb Constituency.

Career 
Venonya started working as a chef in Kalahari Hotel in Windhoek, Namibia. Her political career began when she was elected as the Swapo section leader in the Moses //Garoeb constituency in 2003. A member of SWAPO party, she served in various positions in Swapo, including district treasurer, information and mobilisation officer and coordinator. She served as a regional authority councillor of the Moses ǁGaroëb Constituency since 2020 until her death in 2022.

Venonya was the founder and managing director of Aili Catering and Training Services, which was founded in 2010.

Community work 
Venonya was a volunteer at Reach for Recovery volunteer at the Cancer Association of Namibia, a recovery programme supported by breast cancer patients who extend a helping hand and network in the fight against breast cancer. Venonya served as a board member for Ombili Community Centre.

Recognition 
She was praised by President Hage Geingob for her contributions to the hospitality sector and the socio-economic development of the Moses ||Garoeb Constituency.

References 

1963 births
2022 deaths
SWAPO politicians
Namibian women in politics
Politicians from Windhoek